This article describes the squads for the 2012 African Women's Championship.

Group A

DR Congo
Head coach: Gauthier Muzangi

Equatorial Guinea
Head coach: Esteban Becker

Senegal
Head coach: Bassouaré Diaby

South Africa
Head coach: Joseph Mkhonza

Group B

Cameroon
Head coach: Enow Ngachu

Ethiopia
Head coach: Abreham Teklehaymanot Kahsay

Ivory Coast
Head coach: Clémentine Touré

Nigeria
Head coach: Kadiri Ikhana

References

squads
Women's Africa Cup of Nation's squads